Just for One Day is an Ethiopian 2008 short documentary film.

Synopsis
The portrait of a single mother as she tries to make a living for her daughter and herself on the outskirts of Addis Abeba, Ethiopia.

Awards
 Ethiopian IFF 2009

External links

2008 short documentary films
2008 films
Ethiopian documentary films
Films set in Ethiopia